John E. O'Brien    (October 22, 1851 – December 31, 1914) was a professional baseball player who played outfielder in the Major Leagues in 1884 for the Baltimore Monumentals of the Union Association. He later played for the Bridgeport Giants of the Eastern League in 1885.

External links

1851 births
1914 deaths
Major League Baseball outfielders
Baltimore Monumentals players
19th-century baseball players
Bridgeport Giants players
Baseball players from Columbus, Ohio